The 2001 Green Party of Ontario leadership election took place November 3, 2001 when Frank de Jong's leadership was challenged by GPO deputy leader Judy Greenwood-Speers of Waterloo, Ontario.

De Jong, who had led the GPO since 1993, received 271 votes and defeated Greenwood-Speers.

Candidates

 Frank de Jong, elementary school teacher and GPO leader since 1993
 Judy Greenwood-Speers, registered nurse, GPO deputy leader

References

External links
 Green Party of Ontario website

2001 elections in Canada
Ontario, 2001
2001 in Ontario
2001
November 2001 events in Canada
Green Party of Ontario leadership election